Thomas Pinault (born 4 December 1981) is a French former professional footballer who played as a midfielder in the Football League for Colchester United, Grimsby Town and Brentford, and his native country for Cannes and RC Grasse.

Career

Colchester United 
A product of the Cannes youth system, Pinault moved to England to join Second Division club Colchester United on a free transfer in June 1999. After making just 10 appearances during his first two full seasons at Layer Road, he broke into the first team squad during the 2001–02 season and signed a new two-and-a-half year contract in October 2001. Pinault remained with Colchester United until his contract expired at the end of the 2003–04 season, by which time he had made 157 appearances and scored seven goals for the club.

Grimsby Town 
After an unsuccessful trial with Dundee United and turning down a contract from Northampton Town, Pinault signed a one-year contract with League Two club Grimsby Town on a free transfer in July 2004. Pinault was a regular in the team during the 2004–05 season, making 47 appearances and scoring seven goals, but his relationship with manager Russell Slade deteriorated after he was "singled-out for criticism" by Slade for his defensive performance during a 2–2 draw with Notts County late in the season. He was released at the end of the 2004–05 season. In 2006, Pinault's remarks about his time at Blundell Park were chosen as one of BBC Sport's Quotes of the Year:

Brentford 
After a year out of football with an ankle ligament injury, Pinault returned to England sign a one-year contract with League One club Brentford on a free transfer in July 2006. Despite being transfer-listed by incoming manager Scott Fitzgerald in December 2006, Pinault remained at Griffin Park for the duration of the 2006–07 season and made 37 appearances, scoring one goal. He was released in June 2007, after Brentford's relegation to League Two was confirmed.

Crawley Town 
Pinault joined Conference Premier club Crawley Town on a one-year contract in July 2007. Through successive one-year extensions of his contract, he remained at the Broadfield Stadium for three seasons and made over 110 appearances for the club. Pinault rejected a new contract and left Crawley at the end of the 2009–10 season.

RC Grasse
Early in the 2010–11 season, Pinault returned to France to join hometown Championnat de France Amateur 2 club RC Grasse. He remained at the Stade Jean Girard until his retirement at the end of the 2012–13 season.

Personal life
Thomas is the brother of footballer Clément Pinault. After retiring from football, he became an estate agent.

Career statistics

Honours 
Colchester United
 Harwich Charity Cup Centenary Shield: 1999

References

External links

1981 births
Living people
People from Grasse
Sportspeople from Alpes-Maritimes
French footballers
Association football midfielders
National League (English football) players
Championnat National 3 players
AS Cannes players
Brentford F.C. players
Colchester United F.C. players
Grimsby Town F.C. players
Crawley Town F.C. players
RC Grasse players
French expatriate footballers
French expatriate sportspeople in England
Expatriate footballers in England
Footballers from Provence-Alpes-Côte d'Azur